AOL is an American company that invests in brands and web sites.

AOL may also refer to:

Technology 
 AOL, abbreviation of aspect-oriented language
 AOL Explorer, a web browser made by AOL
 AOL Broadband, a trading name of TalkTalk Telecom PLC, an Internet service provider in the UK
 Alert on LAN, a PC remote management technology from IBM and Intel

Entertainment 
 Zelda II: The Adventure of Link, the second video game in The Legend of Zelda series
 Archers of Loaf, an American indie rock band
 The Angels of Light, a US-based experimental folk-rock group
 The Angels of Light (UK band), an occasional UK-based electronic rock group

Sports 
 Academy of Light, Sunderland AFC's training ground
 Amateur Oberliga (football), the fifth tier of German football

Transport 
 Paso de los Libres Airport, Corrientes, Argentina, an airport with IATA airport code AOL
 Angkor Airlines, a defunct Cambodian airline with the ICAO airline code AOL

Other 
 Archives de l'Orient Latin, the early part of the Revue de l'Orient Latin, a collection of medieval documents
 Arrow of Light, the highest award in American Cub Scouting
 Art of Living Foundation, a non-profit, volunteer based organization founded by Sri Sri Ravi Shankar and based in Bangalore, India